Rabha is a Sino-Tibetan language of Northeast India. The two dialects, Maituri and Rongdani, are divergent enough to cause problems in communication. According to U.V. Joseph, there are three dialects, viz. Róngdani or Róngdania, Mayturi or Mayturia and Songga or Kocha (page ix). Joseph writes that "the Kocha dialect, spoken along the northern bank of the Brahmaputra, is highly divergent and is not intelligible to a Róngdani or Mayturi speaker" (page ix). Joseph also writes that "[t]he dialect variations between Róngdani and Mayturi, both of which are spoken on the southern bank of the Brahmaputra, in the Goalpara district of Assam and belong to the northern slopes of Meghalaya, are minimal" (pages ix-x). He concludes the paragraph on dialectal variation with: "The Róngdani-Mayturi dialectal differences become gradually more marked as one moves further west" (page x).

In 2007, U.V. Joseph published a grammar of Rabha with Brill in their series Languages of the Greater Himalayan Region.

Geographical distribution
According to the Ethnologue, Rabha is spoken in the following areas of India.

Darrang district, Goalpara district, and Kamrup district, western Assam
Nagaland
Jalpaiguri district and Alipurduar district, West Bengal
Tufanganj subdivision, Koch Bihar district
East Garo Hills district and West Garo Hills district, Meghalaya

See also
 Rabha people
 Rabha Hasong Autonomous Council
 Rabha Baptist Church Union

References

Sal languages
Endangered languages of India
Languages of Assam